The 2018 Paris–Tours was the 112th edition of the Paris–Tours cycling classic. The race was held on 7 October 2018 as part of the 2018 UCI Europe Tour as a 1.HC-ranked event. Søren Kragh Andersen won in a time of 4h 37' 55" ahead of Niki Terpstra and Benoît Cosnefroy.

Teams
Twenty-three teams of up to seven riders started the race.

UCI WorldTeams

 
 
 
 
 
 
 
 
 

UCI Professional Continental Teams

 
 
 
 
 
 
 
 
 
 
 

UCI Continental Teams

Results

References

External links
Official website

2018 UCI Europe Tour
Paris–Tours
Paris-Tours
Paris-Tours